Enlighten Thy Daughter may refer to:
 Enlighten Thy Daughter (1917 film), an American silent drama film
 Enlighten Thy Daughter (1934 film), an American drama film